is a Japanese curler from Karuizawa. He  skipped the Japanese men's team at the 2018 Winter Olympics. He currently coaches the Chubu Electric Power Curling Team.

Curling career
Yusuke Morozumi was the skip of the Japanese team at the 2004 World Junior Curling Championships, placing 9th.

In 2008, by finishing 2nd at the Pacific Curling Championships he and his team qualified for the 2009 World Men's Curling Championships, finishing 10th overall. Since then, he has skipped Japan at the 2013 (11th place), 2014 (5th), 2015 (6th), 2016 (4th) and 2017 (7th) World Championships. In total, he has played in 9 Pacific-Asia Curling Championships (as of 2017), with his best finish coming at the 2016 Pacific-Asia Curling Championships where he captured gold.

Morozumi skipped the Japanese team which also included Tetsuro Shimizu, Tsuyoshi Yamaguchi, Kosuke Morozumi and Kohsuke Hirata at the 2018 Winter Olympics. There, he led his team to a 4-5 record, in 8th place overall.

Personal life
Morozumi is married and works as a sports instructor.
He is a graduate of Kanazawa University. He has three children.

Teams

Grand Slam record

References

External links

Curlit.com biography

1985 births
Living people
People from Karuizawa, Nagano
Sportspeople from Nagano Prefecture
Japanese male curlers
Asian Games medalists in curling
Curlers at the 2017 Asian Winter Games
Medalists at the 2017 Asian Winter Games
Asian Games silver medalists for Japan
Curlers at the 2018 Winter Olympics
Olympic curlers of Japan
Pacific-Asian curling champions
Japanese curling champions
Competitors at the 2007 Winter Universiade
Japanese curling coaches
21st-century Japanese people